Ricardo Gomes Vilana (born 18 July 1981) is a retired Brazilian footballer.

Career

Unirea Urziceni
He was brought to Urziceni by his brother-in-law, Alex Leandro who was playing there. Ricardo won the 2008–09 Liga I edition with Unirea Urziceni, under the coaching of Dan Petrescu. He was also part of the team which played in the 2009–10 UEFA Champions League group stage.

Steaua București
In August 2010 he signed a contract with Steaua București alongside teammates from Unirea Urziceni: Galamaz, Marinescu, Apostol, Bilaşco, Onofraş and Brandán.

On 4 September 2010 he made his Liga II debut for Steaua II București against Juventus București, Steaua II won, 1–0 with his goal.

On 26 September 2010 he made his Liga I debut for Steaua București.

On 4 May 2011 he terminated contract with Steaua by mutual agreement.

FC Andorra 
On 23 August 2013 he signed a contract with FC Andorra.

Honours
Unirea Urziceni
Liga I: 2008–09
Steaua București
Cupa României: 2010–11

References

External links

1981 births
Living people
Brazilian footballers
Brazilian expatriate footballers
Campeonato Brasileiro Série C players
Liga I players
Expatriate footballers in Switzerland
Brazilian expatriate sportspeople in Switzerland
Expatriate footballers in Romania
Brazilian expatriate sportspeople in Romania
Expatriate footballers in Azerbaijan
Brazilian expatriate sportspeople in Azerbaijan
Associação Portuguesa de Desportos players
Esporte Clube Novo Hamburgo players
FC Unirea Urziceni players
FC Steaua București players
FC Steaua II București players
Khazar Lankaran FK players
Guaratinguetá Futebol players
Coritiba Foot Ball Club players
FC Andorra players
Association football midfielders
Footballers from São Paulo